Amt Gransee und Gemeinden is an Amt ("collective municipality") in the district of Oberhavel, in Brandenburg, Germany. Its seat is in Gransee.

The Amt Gransee und Gemeinden consists of the following municipalities:
Gransee
Großwoltersdorf
Schönermark
Sonnenberg
Stechlin

Demography

References 

Gransee
Oberhavel